Stephen Thomas Ridings (born August 14, 1995) is an American professional baseball pitcher for the New York Mets of Major League Baseball (MLB). He made his MLB debut with the New York Yankees in 2021.

Career

Amateur career
Ridings attended St. Anthony's High School in South Huntington, New York, and played college baseball at Haverford College.

Chicago Cubs
Ridings was drafted by the Chicago Cubs in the eighth round of the 2016 Major League Baseball draft. Ridings made his professional debut in 2017 with the rookie-level Arizona League Cubs, logging a 4.09 ERA in 12 appearances. In 2018, Ridings played for the Low-A Eugene Emeralds, pitching to a 4.15 ERA with 44 strikeouts in 34.2 innings across 22 games.

Kansas City Royals
On March 9, 2019, the Cubs traded Ridings to the Kansas City Royals for Donnie Dewees. Ridings spent the 2019 season with the rookie-level Idaho Falls Chukars, but struggled to a 4-3 record and 5.91 ERA with 88 strikeouts in 13 games (11 of them starts). Ridings did not play in a game in 2020 due to the cancellation of the minor league season because of the COVID-19 pandemic. On November 4, 2020, Ridings was released by the Royals organization.

New York Yankees
On January 18, 2021, Ridings signed a minor league contract with the New York Yankees. Ridings began the year with the Double-A Somerset Patriots, posting a 0.47 ERA in 14 appearances with the team before being promoted to Triple-A. On July 21, while pitching for the Scranton/Wilkes-Barre RailRiders, he combined with Luis Gil and Reggie McClain to throw a no-hitter.

Ridings made his major league debut on August 3, 2021, in which he struck out three batters and allowed one hit. Luis Gil started the game and Brody Koerner also pitched. It was only the second time that three pitchers debuted in the same game for the Yankees, previously occurring on September 26, 1950. Ridings pitched to a 1.80 ERA in five appearances with the big league club before being returned to Triple-A Scranton on August 17. The Yankees added Ridings to their 40-man roster after the 2021 season on November 19, 2021.

Ridings began the 2022 season with a right shoulder impingement. He began throwing bullpen sessions in August, but never appeared in a game having spent the entire season on the injured list.

New York Mets
On November 15, 2022, the New York Mets claimed Ridings from the Yankees off of waivers.

Personal life
After the 2020 minor league season was canceled, Ridings worked out on his own, paying the bills by selling sports equipment and teaching chemistry as a substitute teacher at the Palm Beach Maritime Academy in Lantana, Florida.

References

External links

1995 births
Living people
People from Huntington, New York
Baseball players from New York (state)
Major League Baseball pitchers
New York Yankees players
Haverford Fords baseball players
Arizona League Cubs players
Eugene Emeralds players
Idaho Falls Chukars players
Somerset Patriots players
Scranton/Wilkes-Barre RailRiders players